SBC may refer to:

Organizations

Education
 St Bernard's College, Lower Hutt, Wellington, New Zealand
 St. Brendan's College, Yeppoon, Queensland, Australia 
 Sarawak Biodiversity Centre, Malaysia
 Singapore Bible College
 Sino-British College, Shanghai, China
 Sitting Bull College, a tribal college, Fort Yates, North Dakota, US
 Steinbach Bible College, Manitoba, Canada
 Sweet Briar College, Sweet Briar, Virginia

Companies

Broadcasting
 Samoa Broadcasting Corporation
 School of Broadcasting & Communication, India
 Seychelles Broadcasting Corporation
 Shin-etsu Broadcasting, Nagano Prefecture, Japan
 Singapore Broadcasting Corporation, later Mediacorp
 Southern Cross Broadcasting, a former Australian company
 Saudi Broadcasting Corporation, former name of the Saudi Broadcasting Authority
 Swiss Broadcasting Corporation

Other
 Sadharan Bima Corporation, Bangladesh
 SBC Cinemas, cinema chain in Taiwan, now part of Vue International
 SBC Telecom, a US telecom corporation
 Seattle's Best Coffee, American coffee retailer
 Security Bank Corporation, Philippines
 Service Bureau Corporation, former IBM subsidiary divested in 1973
 South Bay Conservatory, a performing arts company, Los Angeles, California, US
 Southwestern Bell Corporation, now AT&T Inc.
 Swiss Bank Corporation

Government
 Stevenage Borough Council, Hertfordshire, UK
 Scarborough Borough Council, North Yorkshire, UK
 Scottish Borders Council, UK

Sport
 Sandusky Bay Conference, a high school sports conference in the US state of Ohio
 Scottish Basketball Championship
 Sun Belt Conference, an American college sports conference

Other organizations
 Southern Baptist Convention, a US Christian denomination
 Satmar Bikur Cholim, a Jewish hospital aid organization
  (Brazilian Computer Society)

Science and technology
 Schwarz Bayesian criterion, a tool of model selection in regression analysis
 Chevrolet small-block engine or Small Block Chevy, a type of automobile engine
 Standard bicarbonate concentration, in physiology
 Spectroscopic binary catalogue, containing orbital data for spectroscopic binary stars

Computing
 Session border controller, protecting VoIP networks
 Single-board computer
 Smart Bitrate Control, for video compression
 Sub-band coding, in signals
 SBC (codec), used by Bluetooth
 System basis chip, an integrated circuit

Other uses
 Bangalore City railway station (station code), India
 Curtiss SBC Helldiver, a US Navy bomber